Ašašninkai is a village in Varėna district municipality, in Alytus County, in southeastern Lithuania. According to the 2021 census, the village has a population of 27 people. 
In the years 1921-1945 the village was within the borders of Poland.

Ašašninkai village is located c.  from Druskininkai,  from Marcinkonys,  from Kabeliai (the nearest settlement),  from the Belarusian border.

References

Villages in Varėna District Municipality